Fairmount is a census-designated place (CDP) in Hamilton County, Tennessee, United States. The population was 2,193 at the 2020 census, down from 2,825 at the 2010 census. It is part of the Chattanooga, TN–GA Metropolitan Statistical Area.

Fairmont is located within the town of Signal Mountain's zip code, 37377, along with the town of Walden to the east.

Geography
Fairmount is located on Walden Ridge at  (35.176143, -85.333190).

Demographics

At the 2000 census, there were 2,600 people, 900 households and 758 families residing in the CDP. The racial makeup of the CDP was 98.77% White, 0.27% African American, 0.08% Native American, 0.46% Asian, 0.08% from other races, and 0.35% from two or more races. Hispanic or Latino of any race were 0.42% of the population.

There were 900 households, of which 43.4% had children under the age of 18 living with them, 75.9% were married couples living together, 6.2% had a female householder with no husband present, and 15.7% were non-families. 13.1% of all households were made up of individuals, and 4.8% had someone living alone who was 65 years of age or older. The average household size was 2.89 and the average family size was 3.18.

28.9% of the population were under the age of 18, 6.0% from 18 to 24, 27.8% from 25 to 44, 29.2% from 45 to 64, and 8.1% who were 65 years of age or older. The median age was 39 years. For every 100 females, there were 100.5 males. For every 100 females age 18 and over, there were 98.1 males.

The median household income was $61,141 and the median family income was $71,019. Males had a median income of $47,482 and females $29,500. The per capita income was $30,832. About 1.6% of families and 2.6% of the population were below the poverty line, including 3.0% of those under age 18 and 4.1% of those age 65 or over.

References

Census-designated places in Hamilton County, Tennessee
Census-designated places in Tennessee
Chattanooga metropolitan area